An election to Belfast Corporation took place in January 1920 as part of that year's Irish local elections. The Local Government (Ireland) Act 1919 had seen elections for local government in Ireland change to a more proportional system. As a result, Unionist dominance of the Belfast council was somewhat undermined, and the party lost 15 seats. In contrast Labour, Sinn Féin, and Nationalist representation grew, resulting in a more politically and socially representative council.

147 candidates stood for the sixty seats on the council.  The sixty seats were in nine new wards, identical to the parliamentary constituencies.  In advance of the election, the Irish Times stated that it expected the Unionists to lose between five and eight seats, to be picked up by the Labour and Nationalist candidates, with Sinn Féin having a chance of taking one or two seats.

The result in the Falls was controversial; over twenty candidates stood, creating the most complex election by single-transferable vote to date; and 764 votes were disallowed due to spoiled ballot papers.  300 of these lacked an official mark; this was because the printing press marking them had ceased adding it near the end of the run, but this error was not noticed until the election count took place.

After the election Sir William Coates, 1st Baronet was elected by the new council as Lord Mayor of Belfast.

Following the partition of Ireland the Northern Irish Government restored the older, and less representative ward based electoral system.

Results by party

Councillors

Pottinger

Ormeau

Duncairn

Cromac
Crawford McCullough (Unionist)
James McKirnan (Nationalist)
T. McConnell (Unionist)
T. J. Kennedy (Independent Unionist)
H. Riddell (Unionist)
Lennox (Labour Unionist)
Jameson (Unionist)

Shankill

St Anne's
Alexander Boyd (Independent Labour)
G. M. Donaldson (Labour)
J. A. Doran (Unionist)
Alexander Hopkins (Unionist)
James Johnston (Unionist)
Hugh McLaurin (Unionist)

Victoria
John Harkin (Nationalist)
James Augustine Duff (Unionist)
Frank Workman (Unionist)
T. Kennedy (Labour)
Thompson Donald (Labour Unionist)
Joseph Cosgrove (SF)
D. Jones (Unionist)

Woodvale
Joseph Davison (Unionist)
John Graham (Unionist)
Clarke Scott (Labour)
A. Hodgens (Unionist)
W. Macartney (Unionist)
W. Addis (Labour)

Falls

References

1920 Irish local elections
1920
1920s in Ireland
20th century in Belfast